The 2013–14 Texas Longhorns women's basketball team will represent the University of Texas at Austin in the 2013–14 college basketball season. It will be head coach Karen Aston's second season at Texas. The Longhorns were members of the Big 12 Conference and will play their home games at the Frank Erwin Center. They finished the season with a record of 22–12 overall, 11–7 in Big 12 play for a tie for a third-place finish. They lost in the semifinals of the 2014 Big 12 women's basketball tournament to West Virginia. They were invited to the 2014 NCAA Division I women's basketball tournament which they defeated Penn in the first round before getting defeated by Maryland in the second round.

Rankings

Before the season

Departures

Recruiting

2013–14 media

Television & Radio information
Most University of Texas home games will be shown on the Longhorn Network, and select games will be available through FSN affiliates. Women's basketball games will also be carried on the radio via KVET.

Roster

Schedule

|-
!colspan=12 style="background:#CC5500; color:#FFFFFF;"| Exhibition

|-
!colspan=12 style="background:#CC5500; color:#FFFFFF;"| Non-conference regular season

|-
!colspan=12 style="background:#CC5500; color:#FFFFFF;"| Big 12 Regular Season

|-
!colspan=12 style="background:#FFFFF; color:#CC5500;"| 2014 Big 12 women's basketball tournament

|-
!colspan=12 style="background:#FFFFF; color:#CC5500;"| NCAA women's tournament

See also
Texas Longhorns women's basketball

References

Texas Longhorns women's basketball seasons
Texas
Texas
Texas Longhorns
Texas Longhorns